Crag Mill railway station served the village of Belford, Northumberland, England from around 1862 to 1877 on the East Coast Main Line.

History 
The location was proposed for a station to serve Belford but, in 1846, the local populace organised a petition requesting a station at the eventual site of Belford station. In 1862, passengers attending the Northumberland Agricultural Society's annual show were advised to use this station rather than Belford.

The station first appeared in the NER working timetable of February 1871. The station was situated northwest of the level crossing on Cragmill Lane. The station was very short lived. Crag Mill disappeared from the Bradshaw timetable in October 1877. The date on which the station closed completely is unknown.

References

External links 

Disused railway stations in Northumberland
1871 establishments in Scotland
1877 disestablishments in Scotland
Former North Eastern Railway (UK) stations
Railway stations in Great Britain opened in 1862
Railway stations in Great Britain closed in 1877